Pir Gaz (also Romanized as Pīr Gaz) is a village in Eshqabad Rural District, Miyan Jolgeh District, Nishapur County, Razavi Khorasan Province, Iran. At the 2006 census, its population was 269, in 69 families.

References 

Populated places in Nishapur County